Sergio Gustavo Escalante (born 9 March 1986 in Florencio Varela, Argentina) is an Argentine footballer currently playing for Sportivo Ameliano in the Paraguayan División Intermedia.

Early life
Escalante was born in Florencio Varela in the Buenos Aires Province.

Career

Early career
Escalante came through the Newell's Old Boys youth system. Later, Escalante continued his career at Argentino de Rosario.

2007
In 2007, Escalante formed part of Argentine team Temperley's roster with colleagues as goalkeeper Federico Crivelli, and Rodrigo Salomón, Mauro Navas, Cristian Revainera and Fernando Pasquinelli.

2009
In May 2009, Escalante scored a double for Japanese founded club Nikkei Bellmare in a 3–1 home victory against River Plate Asunción in the Primera C. His goals were noted in the 24th and 34th minute. Weeks later, he netted another double in a 4–1 away victory against Deportivo Recoleta, placing Nikkei Bellmare in second place of the Primera C. His goals were noted in the 6th and 45th minute.

2010
In 2010, Escalante joined Sportivo Luqueño on loan from Nikkei Belmare. In July 2010, Escalante's transfer was registered at Sportivo Luqueño from Chilean club Coquimbo Unido. On 1 August 2010, Escalante debuted in the Primera División Paraguaya for Sportivo Luqueño in a 3–0 home defeat against Guaraní. Escalante entered the field in the 82nd minute for Hugo Lusardi.  On 21 August 2010, Escalante scored his first goal for Sportivo Luqueño in a 2–2 away draw against Rubio Ñu, noting his goal in the 86th minute to equalise the game 2–2. On 5 December 2010, Escalante played in his last game for the 2010 season in a 1–1 home draw against Sol de América, playing in 65 minutes of the game.

2011
In June 2011, Escalante joined Ciudad del Este team 3 de Febrero from Sportivo Luqueño.

2012
In May 2012, D10 reported that Escalante would be loaned for six months to Liga MX club Atlante, when it's club president  and coach Ricardo Lavolpe travelled to Paraguay to observe Paraguayan striker José Ortigoza but instead were interested in Escalante.

2021
Escalante featured for Sportivo Ameliano in the 2021 season.

Teams
  Argentino de Rosario 1998–2003
  Temperley 2004–2005
  Tristán Suárez 2006
  Temperley 2006–2009
  Nikkei Bellmare (2009)
  Coquimbo Unido 2010
  Sportivo Luqueño 2010–2013
  3 de Febrero 2011
  Sol de América 2012–2013
  3 de Febrero 2014
  Rubio Ñu 2014–2015
  Deportivo Azogues 2015
  Caacupé FBC 2016 
  Sportivo Trinidense 2017
  Laguna Blanca 2017
  Deportivo Caaguazu 2018
  Sportivo Ameliano 2019–

See also
 List of expatriate footballers in Paraguay
 Players and Records in Paraguayan Football

References

External links
 
 Sergio Escalante at Playmaker
 
 

1986 births
Living people
Argentine footballers
Argentine expatriate footballers
Coquimbo Unido footballers
Sportivo Luqueño players
Expatriate footballers in Chile
Expatriate footballers in Paraguay
Club Atlético 3 de Febrero players
Club Sol de América footballers
Argentino de Rosario footballers
Association football midfielders
Expatriate footballers in Ecuador
Club Atlético Temperley footballers
CSyD Tristán Suárez footballers
Club Rubio Ñu footballers
Deportivo Azogues footballers
Club Sportivo San Lorenzo footballers
Sportivo Trinidense footballers
People from Florencio Varela Partido
Sportspeople from Buenos Aires Province